There have been seventeen baronetcies for persons with the surname Stewart, ten in the Baronetage of Nova Scotia, one in the Baronetage of Ireland and six in the Baronetage of the United Kingdom. See also Steuart baronets, Henderson-Stewart baronets, MacTaggart-Stewart baronets and Stewart-Clark baronets.

The Stewart Baronetcy, of Ramelton in the County of Donegal, was created in the Baronetage of Ireland on 2 May 1623 for the soldier William Stewart. The third Baronet served as Master-General of the Ordnance for Ireland and was created Baron Stewart of Ramelton and Viscount Mountjoy in the Peerage of Ireland in 1683. The second Viscount was also Master-General of the Ordnance for Ireland. The third Viscount was created Earl of Blessington in the Peerage of Ireland in 1745. However, the peerages became extinct on his death in 1769. The baronetcy was passed on to Annesley Stewart, the sixth Baronet. He represented Charlemont in the Irish House of Commons from 1763 to 1797. The seventh Baronet represented Enniskillen in the Irish Parliament between 1783 and 1790 and County Donegal in the British House of Commons between 1802 and 1818. The Earls of Galloway and the Lords Blantyre were members of other branches of this family.

The Stewart Baronetcy, Corsewall, was created in the Baronetage of Nova Scotia on 18 April 1627 for James Stewart. In 1649 he succeeded his father as Earl of Galloway. For more information on this creation, see this title.

The Stewart Baronetcy, of Traquair in the County of Peebles, was created in the Baronetage of Nova Scotia in circa 1628 for John Stewart. In 1633 he was made Earl of Traquair. See this title for further history of baronetcy.

The Stewart Baronetcy (no territorial designation), was created in the Baronetage of Nova Scotia on 2 October 1628 for Andrew Stewart. In 1629 he was made Baron Castle Stewart. See this title for further history of baronetcy.

The Stewart Baronetcy, of Ochiltree, was created in the Baronetage of Nova Scotia on 18 April 1638 for James Stewart, 4th Lord Stuart of Ochiltree (see Lord Ochiltree). However, the patent was cancelled on 7 June 1632.

The Stewart Baronetcy, of Greenock and Blackhall in the County of Renfrew, was created in the Baronetage of Nova Scotia on 27 March 1667.

The Stewart Baronetcy, of Castlemilk in the County of Lanark, was created in the Baronetage of Nova Scotia on 29 February 1668 for Archibald Stewart. The title became extinct on the death of the fifth Baronet in 1797.

The Stewart Baronetcy (no territorial designation), was created in the Baronetage of Nova Scotia on 23 September 1681 for Charles Stewart. He was the eldest surviving son of Alexander Stuart, 5th Earl of Moray and in 1701 he succeeded as Earl of Moray. See this title for further history of baronetcy.

The Stewart Baronetcy, of Blair and Balcaskie in the County of Fife, was created in the Baronetage of Nova Scotia on 2 June 1683 for Thomas Stewart. The title became extinct on the death of the eight Baronet in 1890.

The Stewart Baronetcy, of Allanbank in the County of Berwick, was created in the Baronetage of Nova Scotia on 15 August 1687 for Robert Stewart. The title became extinct on the death of the fifth Baronet in 1849.

The Stewart Baronetcy, of Burray in the County of Orkney, was created in the Baronetage of Nova Scotia on 4 November 1687 for Archibald Stewart. In 1704 the title was inherited by Alexander Stewart, 6th Earl of Galloway. See this title for further history of the baronetcy.

The Stewart Baronetcy, of Tillicoultry in the County of Clackmannan, was created in the Baronetage of Nova Scotia on 24 April 1707 for Robert Stewart. The title became dormant on the death of the second Baronet in 1767.

The Stewart Baronetcy, of Athenree in the County of Tyrone, was created in the Baronetage of the United Kingdom on 21 June 1803 for John Stewart. He was Attorney-General for Ireland from 1799 to 1803 and represented County Tyrone in the British House of Commons. The second Baronet also sat as Member of Parliament for County Tyrone. The sixth Baronet was Deputy Lieutenant of County Tyrone in 1971.

The Stewart Baronetcy, of South Kensington in the County of London, was created in the Baronetage of the United Kingdom on 11 June 1881 for the soldier Donald Martin Stewart. The title became extinct on the death of the third Baronet in 1951.

The Stewart Baronetcy, of Fingask in the County of Perth, was created in the Baronetage of the United Kingdom on 10 December 1920 for John Stewart. The title became extinct on the death of the second Baronet in 1979.

The Stewart Baronetcy, of Balgownie in Bearsden in the County of Dumbarton, was created in the Baronetage of the United Kingdom on 16 December 1920 for James Watson Stewart. He was a member of the Glasgow Corporation from 1904 to 1920 and Lord Provost of Glasgow from 1917 to 1920.

The Stewart Baronetcy, of Stewartby in the County of Bedford, was created in the Baronetage of the United Kingdom on 4 March 1937 for the businessman Malcolm Stewart. He was the founder of The London Brick Company. The title became extinct on the death of his son, the second Baronet, in 1999.

The Stewart Baronetcy, of Strathgarry in the County of Perth, was created in the Baronetage of the United Kingdom on 17 August 1960 for Kenneth Dugald Stewart. He was Chairman of the Trustee Savings Bank Association from 1946 to 1965. The third Baronet died in 2022 and as there were no living male descendants of the first Baronet, the baronetcy is extinct.

Stewart baronets, of Ramelton (1623)
Sir William Stewart, 1st Baronet (died )
Sir Alexander Stewart, 2nd Baronet (died 1653)
Sir William Stewart, 3rd Baronet (1653–1692) (created Viscount Mountjoy in 1683)

Viscounts Mountjoy (1683)
William Stewart, 1st Viscount Mountjoy (1653–1692)
William Stewart, 2nd Viscount Mountjoy (died 1728)
William Stewart, 3rd Viscount Mountjoy (1709–1769) (created Earl of Blessington in 1745)

Earls of Blessington (1745)
William Stewart, 1st Earl of Blessington (1709–1769)

Stewart baronets, of Ramelton (1623; Reverted)
Sir Annesley Stewart, 6th Baronet (1725–1801)
Sir James Stewart, 7th Baronet (c. 1756–1827)
Sir James Annesley Stewart, 8th Baronet (1798–1879)
Sir Augustus Abraham James Stewart, 9th Baronet (1832–1889)
Sir William Augustus Annesley Stewart, 10th Baronet (1865–1894)
Sir Harry Jocelyn Urquhart Stewart, 11th Baronet (1871–1945)
Sir Jocelyn Harry Stewart, 12th Baronet (1903–1982)
Sir Alan d'Arcy Stewart, 13th Baronet (born 1932)

The heir apparent is the present holder's son Nicholas Courtney d'Arcy Stewart (born 1953).
The heir apparent's heir presumptive is his brother Lindsay Stephen d'Arcy Stewart (born 1956).

Stewart baronets, of Corsewall (1627)
see the Earl of Galloway

Stewart baronets, of Traquair (c. 1628)
see the Earl of Traquair

Stewart baronets (1628)
see the Earl Castle Stewart

Stewart baronets, of Ochiltree (1630)
see the Lord Ochiltree

Stewart baronets, of Greenock and Blackhall (1667)
see Shaw-Stewart Baronets

Stewart baronets, of Castlemilk (1668)
(alternatively Stuart)
Sir Archibald Stewart, 1st Baronet (died c. 1670)
Sir William Stewart, 2nd Baronet (died 1715)
Sir Archibald Stewart, 3rd Baronet (died 1763)
Sir John Stewart, 4th Baronet (died 1781)
Sir John Stewart, 5th Baronet (c. 1740–1797)

Stewart baronets (1681)
see the Earl of Moray

Stewart baronets, of Blair and Balcaskie (1683)
See Drummond-Stewart baronets

Stewart baronets, of Allanbank (1687)
See Steuart baronets

Stewart baronets, of Burray (1687)
See the Earl of Galloway

Stewart baronets, of Tillicoultry (1707)
Sir Robert Stewart, 1st Baronet (c. 1655–1710)
Sir Robert Stewart, 2nd Baronet (c. 1700–1767)

Stewart baronets, of Athenree (1803)
Sir John Stewart, 1st Baronet (–1825)
Sir Hugh Stewart, 2nd Baronet (1792–1854)
Sir John Marcus Stewart, 3rd Baronet (1830–1905)
Sir Hugh Houghton Stewart, 4th Baronet (1858–1942)
Sir George Powell Stewart, 5th Baronet (1861–1945)
Sir Hugh Charlie Godfray Stewart, 6th Baronet (1897–1994)
Sir David John Christopher Stewart, 7th Baronet (1935–2022)
Sir Hugh Nicholas Stewart, 8th Baronet (b. 1955)

The heir presumptive is the present holder's only son, Kieran Andrew Liam Stewart (born 1979).

Stewart baronets, of South Kensington (1881)
Sir Donald Martin Stewart, 1st Baronet (1824–1900)
Sir Norman Robert Stewart, 2nd Baronet (1851–1926)
Sir Douglas Law Stewart, 3rd Baronet (1878–1951)

Stewart baronets, of Balgownie (1920)
Sir James Watson Stewart, 1st Baronet (1852–1922)
Sir Alexander Stewart, 2nd Baronet (1886–1934)
Sir James Watson Stewart, 3rd Baronet (1889–1955)
Sir James Watson Stewart, 4th Baronet (1922–1988)
Sir (John) Keith Watson Stewart, 5th Baronet (1929–1990)
Sir (John) Simon Watson Stewart, 6th Baronet (born 1955)

The heir apparent is the present holder's only son Hamish Watson Stewart, Younger of Balgownie (born 1983).

Stewart baronets, of Fingask (1920)
Sir John Henderson Stewart, 1st Baronet (1877–1924)
Sir Bruce Fraser Stewart, 2nd Baronet (1904–1979)

Stewart baronets, of Stewartby (1937)
Sir (Percy) Malcolm Stewart, 1st Baronet (1872–1951)
Sir Ronald Compton Stewart, 2nd Baronet (1903–1999)

Stewart baronets, of Strathgarry (1960)
Sir Kenneth Dugald Stewart, GBE, 1st Baronet (1882–1972)
Sir David Brodribb Stewart, 2nd Baronet (1913–1992)
Sir Alastair Robin Stewart, 3rd Baronet (1925–2022)

See also
 Steuart baronets of Coltness
 Stuart baronets

Notes

References
Kidd, Charles, Williamson, David (editors). Debrett's Peerage and Baronetage (1990 edition). New York: St Martin's Press, 1990, 

Baronetcies in the Baronetage of Ireland
Baronetcies in the Baronetage of Nova Scotia
Baronetcies in the Baronetage of the United Kingdom
Dormant baronetcies in the Baronetage of Nova Scotia
Extinct baronetcies in the Baronetage of Nova Scotia
Extinct baronetcies in the Baronetage of the United Kingdom
1627 establishments in Nova Scotia
1623 establishments in Ireland
1803 establishments in the United Kingdom
Clan Stewart